The Mao languages are a branch of the Omotic languages spoken in Ethiopia. The group had the following categories:
Bambasi, spoken in the Bambasi woreda of Benishangul-Gumuz Region,
Hozo and Seze (often described together as 'Begi Mao'), spoken around Begi in the Mirab (West) Welega Zone of the Oromia Region, and
Ganza, which is spoken south of Bambasi in the Asosa Zone of Benishangul-Gumuz Region and west of the Hozo and Seze languages.

It is estimated that there are 5,000 speakers of Bambasi, 3,000 speakers each of Hozo and Seze and a few hundred Ganza speakers (Bender, 2000). During recent political upheavals, a few thousand Bambassi speakers established themselves in the valley of the Didessa River and Belo Jegonfoy woreda. Much of the Mirab Welega Zone was once the home of Mao languages, but they have lost speakers because of the increasing influence of Oromo.

Contact
Mao languages are in close contact with Koman languages. Some Koman-speaking groups in Ethiopia consider themselves to be ethnically Mao.

Numerals
Comparison of numerals in individual languages:

See also
Mao word lists (Wiktionary)

Further reading

References

Languages of Ethiopia
Language families
 
Omotic languages